Magpie Murders is a 2016 mystery novel by British author Anthony Horowitz and the first novel in the Susan Ryeland series. The story focuses on the murder of a mystery author and uses a story within a story format.

The book has been translated into multiple languages and has been adapted into a six-part television drama series with the same title.

Synopsis

An unmarried, middle-aged editor named Susan Ryeland receives from her superior the handwritten manuscript of the latest projected novel of the best-selling writer Alan Conway, but notices that the final chapter is missing. Shortly afterwards, she learns that Alan Conway has died in an apparent suicide by falling off the tower of his mansion. A suicide note in Conway's own handwriting is delivered to her office. However, she has nagging doubts about the reality of the events, and decides to investigate Conway's death in order to know the truth, and to find where the last chapter of the manuscript went.

Development
Horowitz first developed the concept of Magpie Murders during the first season of Midsomer Murders, which premiered in 1997. He has stated that he wanted the novel to "be more than just a murder mystery story" and to be "a sort of a treatise on the whole genre of murder mystery writing. How the writers come up with the ideas; how these books are formed."

Release
Magpie Murders was first released in hardback and e-book format in the United Kingdom on 6 October 2016 through Orion. An audiobook adaptation narrated by Allan Corduner and Samantha Bond was simultaneously released through Orion and BrillianceAudio. The novel was given a release in the United States the following year through HarperCollins and HarperAudio in hardback, e-book, and audiobook format. Paperback editions were released in the United Kingdom in 2017 and the United States in 2018.

In the following years the novel has been released into multiple languages that include Korean and Japanese (2018, through The Open Books (열린책들) and 東京創元社, respectively),  as well as Chinese and German (2019, 新星出版社 and Berlin Insel Verlag, respectively).

Reception
Reception for Magpie Murders was largely positive, earning a "Rave" rating from the book review aggregator Book Marks based on eight independent reviews. It was reviewed by outlets such as The New York Times and Time magazine, the latter of which called it the "thinking mystery fan’s ideal summer thriller." Common praise for the series centered upon its characters and the use of the story within a story, with some criticism noting that the story within a story also made it difficult to keep up with the goings on.

Adaptation
In July 2020 Deadline announced that PBS’ Masterpiece would adapt the novel into a six-part drama series and air it in the US, and on BritBox in the UK. Horowitz was to prepare the script and Masterpiece was to produce it along with Jill Green and Eleventh Hour Films. Tim McMullan was signed to portray the character of Atticus Pünd after actor Timothy Spall pulled out of the production due to scheduling issues. Lesley Manville agreed to play the other central character, Susan Ryeland, who has a more significant role in the series than in the book. Daniel Mays, Alexandros Logothetis as Susan's lover, Claire Rushbrook as her sister, Jude Hill and Matthew Beard were also part of the series' cast.

The role of author Alan Conway was played by Conleth Hill. Other members of the cast included Pippa Haywood, Michael Maloney and Beverley Longhurst. Director for the series was Peter Cattaneo.

The television series was filmed in 2021 in and around Dublin, Ireland with Dublin City University properties used for some scenes and in Bloomsbury in County Meath. Some exteriors were shot in London and extensive shooting was completed in Suffolk, where much of the story takes place; the production spent over three weeks in the village of Kersey where the Bell Inn became The Queens Arms.

On Britbox in the UK, the series began streaming on 10 February 2022, while in North America, the PBS series premiered on 16 October 2022.

On Rotten Tomatoes the series has a 100% rating based on reviews from 12 critics, with an average rating of 8 out of 10.

References

External links
 

2016 British novels
British mystery novels
Novels by Anthony Horowitz
Orion Books books